Dolichophis jugularis, the black whipsnake, is a species of snake in the family Colubridae.

Geographic range
Dolichophis jugularis is found in Syria, Cyprus, Greece, Iran, Iraq, Israel, Jordan, Kuwait, Lebanon, Turkey and Malta.

Subspecies
Three subspecies are recognized as being valid, including the nominotypical subspecies.
Dolichophis jugularis asianus 
Dolichophis jugularis cypriacus 
Dolichophis jugularus jugularis

References

External links

Further reading
Arnold EN, Burton JA (1978). A Field Guide to the Reptiles and Amphibians of Britain and Europe. London: Collins. 272 pp. . (Coluber jugularis, pp. 196–197 + Plate 35 + Map 109).
Linnaeus C (1758). Systema naturæ per regna tria naturæ, secundum classes, ordines, genera, species, cum characteribus, differentiis, synonymis, locis. Tomus I. Editio Decima, Reformata. Stockholm: L. Salvius. 824 pp. (Coluber jugularis, new species, p. 225). (in Latin).

Reptiles described in 1758
Taxa named by Carl Linnaeus
Dolichophis
Snakes of Jordan
Reptiles of Cyprus